The 2012 Friends Life t20 was the third season of the Friends Life t20, England's premier domestic Twenty20 competition. The competition ran from 12 June to 25 August 2012. The teams in the tournament remained the same as the previous season.

The schedule of the tournament had been widely criticised the previous season and the ECB had decided to reduce the minimum number of days in which a county would play from 92 to 86 for 2012. This meant a change in format from 2 groups of 9, from which the top 4 would qualify to the quarter-finals, to an arrangement with 3 groups of 6. The format of the knock-out rounds (quarter-finals) remain unchanged. This reduces the number of matches in the competition from 151 to 97 in a return to the format of the 2008 and 2009 editions of the Twenty20 Cup.

Finals Day was at the SWALEC Stadium in Cardiff for the first time. Hampshire Royals and Yorkshire Carnegie, as the winners and runners-up of the tournament respectively, qualified for the 2012 Champions League Twenty20.

In the quarter-final match between Sussex and Gloucestershire, Scott Styris scored the equal third-fastest century in T20 history, after making 100 not out from 37 balls. In the same match, Gloucestershire's James Fuller conceded 38 runs from one over.

Format
The 18 teams are divided into three groups of six and each group plays a double round-robin tournament. The top two teams from each group and the top two third-placed teams qualify for the knockout stage: a three-round single-elimination tournament. The top team from each group and the best second-placed team will each play in a different quarter-final at their home ground. A free draw determines the placement of the remaining four teams and the semi-final and final match-ups.

Teams

Group stage

Midlands/Wales/West Division

Table

Results

Fixtures

North Division

Table

Results

Fixtures

South Division

Table

Results

Fixtures

1. Game moved from Nevill Ground, Royal Tunbridge Wells due to flooding.

Knockout stage

Quarter-finals

Semi-finals

Final

Statistics

Highest team totals
The following table lists the five highest team scores in the season.

Most runs
The top five highest run scorers (total runs) in the season are included in this table.

Highest scores
This table contains the top five highest scores of the season made by a batsman in a single innings.

Most wickets
The following table contains the six leading wicket-takers of the season.

Best bowling figures
This table lists the top five players with the best bowling figures in the season.

References

External links
Tournament Site – Cricinfo
Friends Life t20 Microsite

Friends Life t20
Friends Life t20
2012
Friends Life t20
Twenty20 Cup
Twenty20 Cup
Twenty20 Cup